Alan Young (born Angus Young; November 19, 1919 – May 19, 2016) was a British, Canadian, and American actor, comedian, and radio and television host, whom TV Guide called "the Charlie Chaplin of television". His notable roles include Wilbur Post in the television comedy Mister Ed (1961–1966) and voicing Disney's Scrooge McDuck for over 40 years, first in the 1974 Disneyland Records album An Adaptation of Dickens' Christmas Carol, Performed by The Walt Disney Players.  This was followed by the Academy Award-nominated short film Mickey's Christmas Carol (1983) and then in various other films, TV series and video games up until his death. During the 1940s and 1950s, Young starred in his own variety-comedy sketch shows The Alan Young Show on radio and television, the latter gaining him two Emmy Awards in 1951. He also appeared in a number of feature films, starting from 1946, including the 1960 film The Time Machine and from the 1980s gaining a new generation of viewers appearing in numerous Walt Disney Productions films as both an actor and voice actor.

Early life
Young was born as Angus Young on November 19, 1919, in North Shields, Northumberland, England, to Scottish parents. In his later years he claimed he had been born in 1924. His father was a mine worker and a tap dancer, and his mother was a singer. The family moved to Edinburgh, Scotland, when Young was a toddler and to West Vancouver, British Columbia, Canada, when he was six years old. Young came to love radio when bedridden as a child because of severe asthma. By the time he was in high school, Young had his own comedy radio series on the CBC network, but he left it during the Second World War to serve in the Royal Canadian Navy. He later resigned his Navy commission after learning he would be spending his time writing for a Navy show, and he attempted to join the Canadian Army. According to some sources, the Army rejected him due to his childhood asthma.

Career
After leaving the service, Young moved to Toronto and resumed his Canadian radio career, where he was discovered by an American agent who brought him to New York City in 1944 to appear on American radio. Young's first American radio appearances were on the Philco Radio Hall of Fame. This led to his own show, The Alan Young Show, NBC's summer replacement for the series The Eddie Cantor Show. He switched to ABC two years later, then returned to NBC.

Young's film debut was in Margie (1946), and he was featured in Chicken Every Sunday (1949). In 1950, the television version of The Alan Young Show began. By 1951, the series received not only praise, but also several Primetime Emmy Awards, including Best Actor and Most Outstanding Personality for Young. After its cancellation, Young continued to act in films, among which Androcles and the Lion (1952) and Gentlemen Marry Brunettes (1955), and two George Pal films, Tom Thumb (1958) and The Time Machine (1960). He appeared in the NBC espionage drama Five Fingers ("Thin Ice", 1959), starring David Hedison.

Young was best known, however, for Mister Ed (1961–66), a CBS television show, in which he starred as Wilbur Post, the owner of Mr. Ed, a talking horse who would not talk to anyone but him, thus causing comic situations for Wilbur Post, with his wife, neighbors, and acquaintances. In 1962 while not filming Mister Ed Young appeared as John Stetson (inventor of the famous western Stetson hat) on Death Valley Days in the episode "The Hat that Won the West." He also starred as Stanley Beamish in the unaired 1966 pilot episode of Mr. Terrific, but apparently declined to appear in the broadcast series in 1967 that followed. In the late 1960s, he retired from acting for several years. During that time, he founded a broadcast division for the Christian Science Church.

During the 1970s, Young became active in voice acting. After 1974, he voiced Scrooge McDuck in numerous Disney films and in the popular series DuckTales (1987-1990). In Mickey's Christmas Carol, he portrayed the character's miserly namesake. He also played Scrooge in video games such as the Kingdom Hearts series, DuckTales: Remastered in 2013, and the Mickey Mouse cartoon "Goofy's First Love" released in 2015. Apart from Scrooge McDuck, his other prominent roles were Farmer Smurf on The Smurfs, Haggis McHaggis on The Ren & Stimpy Show, 7-Zark-7 & Keyop in Battle of the Planets, and Hiram Flaversham in The Great Mouse Detective. He also guest starred on The Love Boat, The Incredible Hulk, The New Scooby and Scrappy-Doo Show, and Spider-Man and His Amazing Friends.

Young later starred in the sitcom Coming of Age for two seasons from 1988 to 1989. In 1991, Alan Young returned to the stage, starring as Cap'n Andy Hawkes in the California Musical Theatre's adaptation of Show Boat. He had been called for the role after Van Johnson, who was initially cast in the part, was hospitalised. He had also appeared in the plays A Funny Thing Happened on the Way to the Forum and The Girl With the Freudian Slip. In 1993, he recreated his role as Filby for the mini-sequel to George Pal's The Time Machine, reuniting him with Rod Taylor, who had played George, the Time Traveller. It was called Time Machine: The Journey Back, directed by Clyde Lucas. In 1994, Young co-starred in the Eddie Murphy film Beverly Hills Cop III. He played the role of Uncle Dave Thornton, the Walt Disney-esque founder of the fictional California theme park Wonderworld, and in that same year, Young played the role of Charlie in the television film, Hart to Hart: Home Is Where the Hart Is.

After 1994, he played at least eight characters, including antique dealer Jack Allen on the radio drama Adventures in Odyssey. In 1997, he did the voice of Haggis McMutton in the PC game The Curse of Monkey Island. His later guest roles in animated series included Megas XLR, Static Shock, House of Mouse, The Ren & Stimpy Show, Duckman, Batman: The Animated Series and TaleSpin. In 2002, he had a cameo as the flower store worker in Simon Wells' remake of The Time Machine, and in 2010, he read H.G. Wells's original novel for 7th Voyage Productions, Inc. Young's television guest roles include Gibbsville, The Love Boat, Murder, She Wrote, St. Elsewhere, Coach, Party of Five, The Wayans Bros., USA High, Hang Time, ER, Maybe It's Me, and Sabrina, the Teenage Witch ("Sweet Charity", 1997) in which he played Zelda's love interest.

Personal life
Young was married three times. He and Mary Anne Grimes were married from 1941 to 1947 and had two children. Young married his second wife Virginia McCurdy in 1948 and they had two children. They divorced in 1995, with Young marrying Mary Chipman the following year, but Young and Chipman then divorced in 1997. He dedicated his book Mr. Ed and Me to her.

Young supported Ronald Reagan, although he stated in a later interview that he was apolitical.

Death
Young spent his later years in Woodland Hills, California, at the Motion Picture & Television Country House and Hospital, a retirement community, where he died of natural causes on May 19, 2016, at the age of 96 and was buried at sea.

Filmography

Radio

Film

Television

Video games

References

External links

 
 
 
 
 The Alan Young Show at Outlaws Old Time Radio Corner

1919 births
2016 deaths
American male comedians
American male film actors
American male radio actors
American male video game actors
American male voice actors
Audiobook narrators
Canadian male comedians
Canadian male film actors
Canadian male radio actors
Canadian male video game actors
Canadian male voice actors
Comedians from California
Burials at sea
English Christian Scientists
British emigrants to Canada
Canadian emigrants to the United States
Outstanding Performance by a Lead Actor in a Comedy Series Primetime Emmy Award winners
People from North Shields
Royal Canadian Navy officers
Royal Canadian Navy personnel of World War II
Disney people